Hedong Subdistrict is a subdistrict of Donghe District, in the southeastern outskirts of Baotou, Inner Mongolia, People's Republic of China. , it has six residential communities (社区) under its administration.

See also
List of township-level divisions of Inner Mongolia

References

Township-level divisions of Inner Mongolia
Baotou